Lanzarote is a novella by the French author Michel Houellebecq, published in France in 2000 from a draft written at an unspecified earlier time.

References

External links
Guardian UK review

2003 French novels
Novels by Michel Houellebecq
French novellas
Novels set in Spain
Lanzarote in fiction
Éditions Flammarion books